Aylmer Lake is a lake along the Lockhart River in the Northwest Territories of Canada. Of lakes in the Northwest Territories, it is the seventh largest.

See also
List of lakes in the Northwest Territories

References

Lakes of the Northwest Territories